Timothy Mark Lang (born January 1948) is Emeritus professor of food policy at City University London's Centre for Food Policy since 2002. He founded the Centre in 1994 and also founded the Cambridge Forum for Sustainability and the Environment.

Selected publications
 Atlas of Food (with E Millstone, Earthscan 2003/2008)
 Food Policy (with D Barling and M Caraher, Oxford University Press, 2009)
 Ecological Public Health (with Geof Rayner, Routledge Earthscan, 2012)
 Food Wars (with Michael Heasman, Routledge, 2015)
 Unmanageable Consumer (with Yiannis Gabriel, Sage, 2015)
A Food Brexit: Time to get real (2017) (With Erik Millstone & Terry Marsden)
"Coronavirus: rationing based on health, equity and decency now needed – food system expert", The Conversation, 2020.
 Feeding Britain, Our Food Problems and How to Fix Them. Penguin, 2020.

References

External links 
Diet, health, inequality: why Britain's food supply system doesn't work
'No guidance, no forward planning': what's wrong with Britain's food supply

Living people
Academics of City, University of London
1948 births
21st-century British farmers
Alumni of the University of Leeds
British nutritionists
Food policy in the United Kingdom